Keratosis pilaris atrophicans faciei  begins in infancy as follicular papules with perifollicular erythema.  Initially, the lesions are restricted to the lateral eyebrows, but with time spread to involve the cheeks and forehead, and may also be associated with keratosis pilaris on the extremities and buttocks.

See also 
 Skin lesion
 Cicatricial alopecia
 Ulerythema
 List of cutaneous conditions

References

External links 

Genodermatoses